Politics in Mozambique takes place in a framework of a semi-presidential representative democratic republic, whereby the President of Mozambique is head of state and head of government in a multi-party system. Executive power is exercised by the government. Legislative power is vested in both the government and the Assembly of the Republic.

Political history before the introduction of democracy
The last 25 years of Mozambique's history have encapsulated the political developments of the entire 20th century. Portuguese colonialism collapsed in 1974 after a decade of armed struggle, initially led by American-educated Eduardo Mondlane, who was assassinated in 1969. When independence was proclaimed in 1975, the leaders of FRELIMO's military campaign rapidly established a one-party state allied to the Soviet bloc, eliminating political pluralism, religious educational institutions, and the role of traditional authorities.

Mozambique's Portuguese population were ordered to leave the country within 24 hours, an order which was given by Armando Guebuza. Panicked Portuguese left the country via plane, road and sea and had to leave behind all their assets, returning to Portugal where they became destitute and fell under the ridicule of the European Portuguese who saw their rehabilitation as a burden on the country's meager resources. They became known as the "retornados" or refugees. Many Portuguese took their own lives.

The new government gave shelter and support to South African (ANC) and Zimbabwean (ZANU-PF) guerrilla movements while the governments of apartheid South Africa and Rhodesia fostered and financed an armed rebel movement in central Mozambique called the Mozambican National Resistance (RENAMO). Civil war, sabotage from neighbouring states, and economic collapse characterised the first decade of Mozambican independence. Also marking this period were the mass exodus of Portuguese nationals, weak infrastructure, nationalisation, and economic mismanagement. During most of the civil war the government was unable to exercise effective control outside of urban areas, many of which were cut off from the capital. An estimated one million Mozambicans perished during the civil war, 1.7 million took refuge in neighbouring states, and several million more were internally displaced. In the third FRELIMO party congress in 1983, President Samora Machel conceded the failure of socialism and the need for major political and economic reforms. His death, along with several advisers, in a suspicious plane crash in 1986 interrupted progress.

His successor, Joaquim Chissano, continued the reforms and began peace talks with RENAMO. The new constitution enacted in 1990 provided for a multi-party political system, market-based economy, and free elections. The civil war ended in October 1992 with the Rome General Peace Accords.

By mid-1995 the over 1.7 million Mozambican refugees who had sought asylum in neighbouring Malawi, Zimbabwe, Swaziland, Zambia, Tanzania, and South Africa as a result of war and drought had returned, as part of the largest repatriation witnessed in Sub-Saharan Africa. Additionally, a further estimated 4 million internally displaced returned to their areas of origin.

Under supervision of the ONUMOZ peacekeeping force of the United Nations, peace returned to Mozambique. In 1994 the country held its first democratic elections. Joaquim Chissano was elected president with 53% of the vote, and a 250-member National Assembly was voted in with 129 FRELIMO deputies, 112 RENAMO deputies, and 9 representatives of three smaller parties that formed the Democratic Union (UD).

Executive branch

|President
|Filipe Nyusi
|FRELIMO
|15 January 2015
|-
|Prime Minister
|Carlos Agostinho do Rosário
|FRELIMO
|17 January 2015
|}

The Constitution of Mozambique stipulates that the President of the Republic functions as the head of state, head of government, commander-in-chief of the armed forces, and as a symbol of national unity. He is directly elected for a five-year term via run-off voting; if no candidate receives more than half of the votes cast in the first round of voting, a second round of voting will be held in which only the two candidates who received the highest number of votes in the first round will participate, and whichever of the candidates obtains a majority of votes in the second round will thus be elected president. The Prime Minister is appointed by the President. His functions include convening and chairing the Council of Ministers (cabinet), advising the President, assisting the President in governing the country, and coordinating the functions of the other Ministers.

Legislative branch
The Assembly of the Republic (Assembleia da República) has 250 members, elected for a five-year term by proportional representation.

Political parties and elections

In 1994 the country held its first democratic elections. Joaquim Chissano was elected President with 53% of the vote, and a 250-member National Assembly was voted in with 129 FRELIMO deputies, 112 RENAMO deputies, and 9 representatives of three smaller parties that formed the Democratic Union (UD). Since its formation in 1994, the National Assembly has made progress in becoming a body increasingly more independent of the executive. By 1999, more than one-half (53%) of the legislation passed originated in the Assembly.

After some delays, in 1998 the country held its first local elections to provide for local representation and some budgetary authority at the municipal level. The principal opposition party, RENAMO, boycotted the local elections, citing flaws in the registration process. Independent slates contested the elections and won seats in municipal assemblies. Turnout was very low.

In the aftermath of the 1998 local elections, the government resolved to make more accommodations to the opposition's procedural concerns for the second round of multiparty national elections in 1999. Working through the National Assembly, the electoral law was rewritten and passed by consensus in December 1998. Financed largely by international donors, a very successful voter registration was conducted from July to September 1999, providing voter registration cards to 85% of the potential electorate (more than 7 million voters).

The second general elections were held 3–5 December 1999, with high voter turnout. International and domestic observers agreed that the voting process was well organised and went smoothly. Both the opposition and observers subsequently cited flaws in the tabulation process that, had they not occurred, might have changed the outcome. In the end, however, international and domestic observers concluded that the close result of the vote reflected the will of the people.

President Chissano won the presidency with a margin of 4% points over the RENAMO-Electoral Union coalition candidate, Afonso Dhlakama, and began his 5-year term in January 2000. FRELIMO increased its majority in the National Assembly with 133 out of 250 seats. RENAMO-UE coalition won 116 seats, one went independent, and no third parties are represented.

The opposition coalition did not accept the National Election Commission's results of the presidential vote and filed a formal complaint to the Supreme Court. One month after the voting, the court dismissed the opposition's challenge and validated the election results. The opposition did not file a complaint about the results of the legislative vote.

The second local elections, involving 33 municipalities with some 2.4 million registered voters, took place in November 2003. This was the first time that FRELIMO, RENAMO-UE, and independent parties competed without significant boycotts. The 24% turnout was well above the 15% turnout in the first municipal elections. FRELIMO won 28 mayoral positions and the majority in 29 municipal assemblies, while RENAMO won 5 mayoral positions and the majority in 4 municipal assemblies. The voting was conducted in an orderly fashion without violent incidents. However, the period immediately after the elections was marked by objections about voter and candidate registration and vote tabulation, as well as calls for greater transparency.

In May 2004, the government approved a new general elections law that contained innovations based on the experience of the 2003 municipal elections.

Presidential and National Assembly elections took place on 1–2 December 2004. FRELIMO candidate Armando Guebuza won with 64% of the popular vote. His opponent, Afonso Dhlakama of RENAMO, received 32% of the popular vote. FRELIMO won 160 seats in Parliament. A coalition of RENAMO and several small parties won the 90 remaining seats. Armando Guebuza was inaugurated as the President of Mozambique on 2 February 2005.

The candidate of the ruling Mozambican Liberation Front's (Frelimo) Filipe Nyusi has been the President of Mozambique since January 2015 after winning the election in October 2014. In October 2019, President Filipe Nyusi was re-elected after a landslide victory in general election. Frelimo won 184 seats, Renamo got 60 seats and the MDM party received the remaining six in the National Assembly. Opposition did not accept the results because of allegations of fraud and irregularities. Frelimo secured two-thirds majority in parliament which allowed Frelimo to re-adjust the constitution without needing the agreement of the opposition.

Judicial branch
The judiciary comprises a Supreme Court and provincial, district, and municipal courts.

Administrative divisions
Mozambique is divided in 10 provinces (provincias, singular - provincia); Cabo Delgado, Gaza, Inhambane, Manica, Maputo, Nampula, Niassa, Sofala, Tete, Zambezia

International organisation participation
Mozambique is a member of ACP, AfDB, the Commonwealth, CPLP, ECA, FAO, G-77, IBRD, ICAO, ICCt (signatory), ICFTU, ICRM, IDA, IDB, IFAD, IFC, IFRCS, IHO, ILO, IMF, IMO, Interpol, IOC, IOM (observer), ISO (correspondent), ITU, MONUC, NAM, OAU, OIC, OPCW, SADC, UN, UNCTAD, UNESCO, UNHCR, UNIDO, UNMISET, UPU, WCO, WFTU, WHO, WIPO, WMO, WToO and WTrO

See also
 List of Council of Ministers of Mozambique, 1984

References

Further reading
Hanlon, Joseph, and Teresa Smart. Do bicycles equal development in Mozambique?. James Currey Publisher, 2008.
Manning CL. The politics of peace in Mozambique: post-conflict democratisation, 1992-2000. Greenwood Publishing Group; 2002.
Newitt MD. A history of Mozambique. Indiana University Press; 1995.

External links
 "Considerable change" Decentralisation and public participation in Mozambique.

 
Government of Mozambique